The Cobb Galleria Centre is a meeting and convention center in the Cumberland/Galleria district of Cobb County, northwest of Atlanta, Georgia, in the United States. It is also located next to a cluster of mid-rise office buildings, Cumberland Mall, Truist Park, The Battery Atlanta and the Cobb Energy Performing Arts Centre. It has hosted over 20,000 events and 10 million of guests. The venue operates under the direction of the Cobb-Marietta Coliseum and Exhibit Hall Authority and is located at the intersection of three major highways: Interstate 75, Interstate 285, and Cobb Parkway (U.S. 41) just northwest of the city.  The Galleria Specialty Mall, which pre-dates the convention center, is located downstairs, with meeting halls upstairs.

History
Cobb Galleria Centre was constructed in 1994 by the Cobb-Marietta Coliseum and Exhibit Hall Authority to serve the need for a facility to accommodate small and mid-sized tradeshows, conventions, meetings and social events.  With more than 320,000 total square feet, the facility features  of exhibit space, a  ballroom, 20 meeting rooms and four executive boardrooms.

Located within the Galleria complex, an  upscale office/retail/hotel area, the Centre is connected to the Galleria Specialty Mall and the 522-room Renaissance Waverly Hotel.  Accessible by a pedestrian sky bridge are the Sheraton Suites Galleria Hotel, Cumberland Mall, Truist Park and The Battery Atlanta.

The Authority has been able to re-invest in its asset through several acquisitions and construction initiatives, including building additional exhibit space and parking facilities, bringing food and beverage operations in-house and acquiring the Galleria Specialty Shops.  The biggest initiative has been the construction of the state-of-the-art Cobb Energy Performing Arts Centre, which opened in 2007.

Stores

Anna's Place
Gemstone Glam
Classic Jewelry
Design Faze
The Warm Front 
The Gift Galleries
China Sun Express
Cobb Travel & Tourism
Espresso Bar
The Gallery
Murph's
Subway
Fugi Hair Designers
Galleria Newsstand
Hair Europa
Big Chow Grill

External links
Cobb Galleria Centre homepage
Galleria Specialty Mall

Shopping malls in the Atlanta metropolitan area
Convention centers in Georgia (U.S. state)
Buildings and structures in Cobb County, Georgia
Tourist attractions in Cobb County, Georgia